Strangeland is a 1998 American horror film written by Dee Snider and directed by John Pieplow. The film centers around a police detective trying to save his city, as well as his daughter, from an online predator who enjoys bringing "enlightenment" through ritual pain.

The film has a strong emphasis on the Modern Primitive subculture and its ethos of spiritual transcendence through painful rites, showing several such different practices therein. Accordingly, a large amount of dialogue of the film's villain (concerning his personal philosophy) are paraphrases or direct quotations of Fakir Musafar, the father of the Modern Primitive movement.

Plot
Fifteen-year-old Genevieve Gage and her best friend Tiana Moore are typical high school students in Helverton, Colorado who spend their idle time chatting with strangers in chat rooms. After chatting with another apparent student who goes by the screen name of "Captain Howdy," Genevieve and Tiana decide to attend a party at Captain Howdy's house, which is a trap. When neither Genevieve nor Tiana returns home by the next morning, Genevieve's mother, Toni, alerts her husband, local cop Mike Gage. With the assistance of a younger cop named Steve Christian, Gage begins searching for Genevieve and Tiana. The case takes an unexpected turn when Tiana's car is pulled out of a lake with Tiana's tortured body inside and no sign of Genevieve.

Mike discovers that Captain Howdy is into "body art," including significant tattooing, piercing, branding, and scarification. But it is not until Mike's niece Angela Stravelli informs him of Genevieve's penchant for meeting strangers through the Internet that Mike gets his first lead. Meeting the Captain Howdy online, Mike attempts to get Captain Howdy to invite him to a party. Despite the plan going awry, he later figures out Captain Howdy's location and finds his torture chamber. There, Gage finds Genevieve naked and bound, with her mouth stitched shut, as well as five other teenagers who are in similar predicaments. After a brief struggle in which Captain Howdy gets shot, Mike arrests him and discovers his real name is Carlton Hendricks.

Mike thinks he has closed the case. But a year later, Hendricks is declared not guilty by reason of insanity and he is put in the Meistrich Psychiatric Institute, only to be released three years later. Doctors at the Meistrich Institute state that Hendricks, who has been diagnosed as a schizophrenic with a severe chemical imbalance, is okay as long as he is on his medication. So, Hendricks moves back to his old neighborhood. While taking his medicine, Hendricks is timid and apologetic about what he did, but the memories of what Hendricks did are still fresh in the minds of Helverton's residents. Many people are not happy about Hendricks's release, especially an activist group led by Jackson Roth and Catherine "Sunny" Macintosh.

One night, while Roth's teenage daughter, Kelly, is out, a fearful Roth jumps to the conclusion that Hendricks has taken her. Roth calls Catherine and several others and they kidnap Hendricks. During this, Hendricks accidentally drops his medicine bottle, and it is run over by a car. Roth and the group then beat Hendricks and hang him from a tree. As Roth, Catherine, and the others leave, it starts raining and the rope, which turns out to be weak, snaps, saving Hendricks's life. However, the near-death experience, something he had mentioned hoping to attain earlier on in the film, reverts him to being Captain Howdy, this time with revenge on his mind.

After recovering, Hendricks kills Roth's wife Madeline in front of Roth before knocking him unconscious and then kidnapping him. Hendricks also kidnaps Catherine before contacting Mike at the police station. After hanging up with Mike, Hendricks brutally tortures Roth and Catherine. The next day, Toni calls Mike and tells him that Genevieve is missing. When Mike gets home with Steve, Hendricks's face is on Toni's computer screen. Hendricks has Genevieve and her mouth is stitched shut again. Hendricks tortures Genevieve while Mike and Toni watch the screen. After Hendricks disconnects, Genevieve, Roth, Catherine and a few other victims are soon found alive, but brutally tortured, by officers responding to a call. That night, after leaving the torture scene, Mike tracks Hendricks back to the club Xibalba. After a long struggle, Hendricks stands ready to kill Mike with a large meat hook chained to the ceiling. However, Mike sinks the hook into Hendricks's back, slams Hendricks into a wall, and then uses the hook to lift Hendricks off the floor. After Hendricks taunts Mike, Mike pours a flammable liquid on Hendricks, and presumably kills Hendricks by setting him on fire.

Cast

 Dee Snider as Carlton Hendricks / Captain Howdy
 Linda Cardellini as Genevieve Gage
 Kevin Gage as Detective Mike Gage
 Elizabeth Peña as Toni Gage
 Brett Harrelson as Detective Steve Christianson
 Robert Englund as Jackson 'Jack' Roth
 Amy Smart as Angela Stravelli
 Tucker Smallwood as Captain Churchill Robbins / Fetish Man With Studded Hood
 Ivonne Coll as Rose Stravelli
 Robert LaSardo as Matt Myers, Tow-Truck Driver
 J Cooch Lucchese as Xibalba Bouncer / Band Member of Bile
 Barbara Champion as Catherine 'Sunny' MacIntosh
 Amal Rhoe as Tiana Moore

Soundtrack
 Dee Snider – "Inconclusion"
 Sevendust – "Breathe"
 Megadeth – "A Secret Place"
 Pantera – "Where You Come From"
 Anthrax – "Piss N Vinegar"
 Snot – "Absent"
 dayinthelife... – "Street Justice"
 Coal Chamber – "Not Living"
 Bile – "In League"
 Marilyn Manson – "Sweet Tooth"
 Soulfly – "Eye for an Eye"
 Hed PE – "Serpent Boy" (Radio Edit)
 Kid Rock – "Fuck Off", featuring Eminem
 The Clay People – "Awake"
 System of a Down – "Marmalade"
 Nashville Pussy – "I'm the Man"
 Crisis – "Captain Howdy"
 Twisted Sister – "Heroes Are Hard to Find"

Other songs recorded/used in the film but not present on the official CD:

 Backyard Babies – "Highlights" (credited at the end of the movie)
 Crisis – "Methodology" (credited at the end of the movie)
 Paw – "Street Justice" (recorded for the movie; wasn't used for the film nor the CD)

Concept

The film's conceptual basis has its roots in the fourth track on Twisted Sister's 1984 release Stay Hungry. The song, entitled "Horror-Teria (The Beginning): A) Captain Howdy B) Street Justice", tells the story of a sadistic child murderer named Captain Howdy who ultimately walks free on a technicality and is then avenged upon by an outraged mob of parents. A line from the song, spoken by Howdy to one of his victims, carries over into the film after he stitches Genevieve's mouth shut: "There...that's better!" The overall tale of the song and character has similarities with that of A Nightmare on Elm Street and the backstory of Freddy Krueger, although the film debuted in theaters six months after the release of Stay Hungry. The name "Captain Howdy" was taken from The Exorcist, wherein it is the name used early on by the Mesopotamian demon king, Pazuzu, who ultimately possesses Reagan MacNeil.

The Captain Howdy character differs significantly from one medium to another: the song's villain is presented as a cold-blooded monster who is fully in control of his actions and is a traditional killer with no mention of body modifications; conversely, the film portrays a mentally imbalanced man whose motivations are more on par with that of a would-be cult leader. He doesn't initially set out to kill anyone, instead intending to "help" them through forced body modifications and ritualistic pain in the name of transcendental enlightenment, albeit for his own sadistic pleasure.

Filming

The setting for the film takes place in the fictional city of Helverton, Colorado, and was filmed in the Colorado Springs and Denver vicinity. The club scenes for Xibalba were filmed at Denver's Church nightclub, and Strangeland was the first TSG Pictures and Artisan DVD release.

Snider had to sit in the makeup chair for several hours every day to be transformed into Captain Howdy. All of the tattoos, brandings, filed teeth, and body piercings were fake, apart from his septum, which he did indeed have pierced. However, his septum piercing was a standard 14g, and a special piece of jewelry was made to give it the appearance of being around 00g. The septum spike discovered by Christianson, however, is visibly more around 1/2 inch to 5/8 inch.

Reception
 
Although the film took advantage of the inherent dangers of what was at that time the burgeoning precursor to social network platforms, many found the story overly contrived and emotionally flat. This was coupled with what was perceived as poor acting, direction, and cheap and unconvincing makeup effects. 

During its box office run, it grossed $713,239, opening at 315 theaters in North America.

Sequel
In May 2015, a sequel, titled Strangeland: Disciple, was in development by Emaji Entertainment and TSG Entertainment, to be distributed by Lionsgate. Snider planned to have it rated NC-17 and later release an R-rated version for wider exposure. He believed this unusual marketing strategy would create buzz for the "original" NC-17 version. Although the film never made it into production, Snider was still hoping to make the sequel at some point.

Comic

Snider released a comic book prequel, Dee Snider's Strangeland: Seven Sins, through Fangoria Comics, but the company suddenly closed after only the first issue was printed. The Scream Factory then picked up the title and published the full run in 2008.

References

External links
 
 
 
 Strangeland at BME Encyclopedia

1998 films
1998 horror films
1998 independent films
1990s American films
1990s English-language films
1990s horror thriller films
American horror thriller films
American independent films
Artisan Entertainment films
Body modification
Films adapted into comics
Films scored by Anton Sanko
Modern primitive